Cartoon Network was a Spanish pay television channel  operated by Warner Bros. Discovery under its International division. Launched on 4 March 1994, it is a Spanish equivalent to the original American network, the channel primarily airs animated programming.

Besides being available in Castilian Spanish, most shows were also available in English via a secondary audio feed.

History
In 1993, Cartoon Network had a single European signal distributed via the Astra satellite, and already had five audios in different languages. On 4 March 1994 (although Turner initially said it would happen before the end of 1993) the sixth language of the channel was incorporated: Spanish. Later, the channel was also incorporated into Spanish cable networks. In 1997, Canal Satélite Digital signed an agreement with Time Warner in which, apart from obtaining rights from the production company, it also benefited from the entry of Cartoon Network and TNT in its offer. The channel was broadcast in the majority of pay TV companies, in some including the Cartoon Network +1 channel, with the same programming, but one hour later. In addition, a magazine called Cartoon Network Magazine was published, but it did not manage the channel, since the license belonged to another owner.

Channel shutdown 
Turner Broadcasting System Europe announced on 14 June 2013 that Cartoon Network and Cartoonito would close in Spain on 30 June 2013. On 20 June, it was published on the blog of the Cartoon Network website the cessation of its television broadcasts, but nothing that the website would remain active, as it came to have a television on demand (VOD) service for tablets, smartphones or televisions connected to the Internet in which viewers could watch the series and content of the channel. It was also explained that these contents would also be available on the channel's website, and that Turner would increase its presence in Boing, the children's thematic channel of the audiovisual group Mediaset España Comunicación, with which it has a joint venture in the aforementioned station.

Shortly before midnight on 1 July 2013, the channel ceased broadcasting in Spain after 19 years, with the last programme to be aired being an episode of Star Wars: The Clone Wars. The channel then displayed a filler ident, and after a few minutes, each operator that distributed the signal replaced it with an information screen informing customers that the channel stopped broadcasting in Spain. Months later, at the end of August, the channel Boing announced that from 14 September every weekend the station would broadcast a block of content called "Findes Cartoon Network" which would broadcast new episodes of Adventure Time and new episodes of Regular Show from 10:30.

References

External links 
  

Cartoon Network
Turner Broadcasting System Spain
Defunct television channels in Spain
Television channels and stations established in 1994
Television channels and stations disestablished in 2013
1994 establishments in Spain
2013 disestablishments in Spain